Belfast Asylum was a psychiatric hospital on the Falls Road in Belfast, Northern Ireland.

History
The hospital, which was designed by Francis Johnston and William Murphy, opened as the Belfast Asylum in 1829. In an important legal case in the mid nineteenth century, the governors of the asylum argued that compulsory religious education of the insane was unwise and successfully persuaded the courts that the Lord Lieutenant of Ireland should not be allowed to appoint chaplains to the asylum. After services transferred to the new Purdysburn Villa Colony, Belfast Asylum closed in 1913. The asylum building was converted for use as the Belfast War Hospital in July 1917 during the First World War. The War Office closed the war facility in winter 1919. In the late 1920s the buildings were demolished and the site cleared to make way for the Royal Maternity Hospital.

References

Further reading

Hospital buildings completed in 1829
Hospitals in Belfast
Hospitals established in 1829
1829 establishments in Ireland
Defunct hospitals in Northern Ireland
Hospitals disestablished in 1919
1919 disestablishments in Ireland
Buildings and structures demolished in the 1920s
Demolished buildings and structures in Northern Ireland
19th-century architecture in Northern Ireland